Partanna is a town and comune in province of Trapani, south-western Sicily, southern Italy.

References

External links

Official website

Municipalities of the Province of Trapani